Nirbachana English:  Election ) is a 1994  Indian Oriya film directed by Biplab Ray Chaudhuri. The film exposes the manoeuvring and corruption of Indian electioneering. A young man is happy to hear the news that the local candidate would offer money for electing him. This money would help him to marry, but he sacrifices the money for an ailing beggar. The story is told through the struggles of several poor villagers of the Indian state of Orissa, each of whom have one of two choices: either working the soil for a wealthy landowner, or "dynamiting" the hills in one of the new quarries—a portrayal of how low humanity can descend when penury and desperation chip away at the social veneer. The film was selected for the Indian Panorama, International Film Festival of India (IFFI) 1996, Delhi.

Synopsis 
In this drama, set within an impoverished village in the state of Orissa, a village chieftain hatches an ingenious but morally bankrupt plot to raise enough dowry so that one of his daughters can marry. The townsfolk have two choices for work: they can become farmers or work in the quarries of the richest man around Zaminder. The quarry work is lucrative but destructive to the local environment and to the health of the people forced to breathe in rock dust. The town is in the process of electing a new village chief and to ensure that he is elected, Zaminder pays villagers money for their votes. The chief's family decides to adopt the town beggar, who is dying of tuberculosis. They promise the beggar that they will see that he is cured if he will hand over his vote money. The deal is struck and the chief and his son take him upon the long journey to get cured. Unfortunately, it is a struggle to keep the dying fellow alive until the election and in the end unexpected tragedy ensues.

Cast
Bhima Singh
Durlav Singh
Bikash Das
Chandra Singh
Bidyut Prava Patnaik
Sangita Dutta
Nikhil Baran Sengupta

Crew 
Biplab Ray Chaudhuri - Director
Biplab Ray Chaudhuri - Story & Screenplay
Debasish Majumder - Executive Producer
Ravi Malik - Executive Producer
Biplab Ray Chaudhuri - Editor
Raju Mishra - Director of Photography
Shantanu Mahapatra - Music
Nikhil Baran Sengupta - Art Director
Nagen Barik - Sound

Music 
Shantunu Mahapatra arranged the music for this film.

References

External links
Review of Nirbachana in www.nfdcindia.com
Review of Nirbachana in movies.yahoo.com
Review of Nirbachana in movies.nytimes.com
Review of Nirbachana in www.film.com
Casting & Crew of Nirbachana in www.citwf.com
Casting & Crew of Nirbachana in ftvdb.bfi.org.uk
 

1994 films
Best Film on Environment Conservation/Preservation National Film Award winners
1990s Odia-language films
National Film Development Corporation of India films